Sufian Abdullah Dawud (born 6 February 1975) is a retired Jordanian footballer of Palestinian origin.

International goals

External links 
 
 kooora.com

1975 births
Living people
Jordanian footballers
Jordan international footballers
Jordanian Pro League players
Bahraini Premier League players
Jordanian people of Palestinian descent
Association football midfielders
Sportspeople from Amman
Al-Wehdat SC players
Busaiteen Club players
Jordanian expatriate footballers
Jordanian expatriates in Bahrain
Expatriate footballers in Bahrain